Kaikkien aikojen Pertsa ja Kilu is a Finnish play. It was written by Taavi Vartia and produced in 2008.

Finnish plays
2008 plays